Cercosaura anomala, the strange pholiodobolus, is a species of lizard in the family Gymnophthalmidae. It is endemic to Peru.

References

Cercosaura
Reptiles of Peru
Endemic fauna of Peru
Reptiles described in 1923
Taxa named by Lorenz Müller
Taxobox binomials not recognized by IUCN